Riverbend Music Center is an outdoor amphitheater located in Cincinnati, Ohio, along the banks of the Ohio River. It has a capacity of 20,500 (6,000 reserved pavilion seats and 14,500 general admission lawn) and was built for the Cincinnati Symphony Orchestra, to allow them to play in an outdoor venue during the summer months. Its location is directly adjacent to Coney Island water park and Belterra Park. Famed architect and 2012 Driehaus Prize winner Michael Graves designed the building. The venue is owned by the Cincinnati Symphony Orchestra,  booked and operated by its subsidiary, Music and Event Management Incorporated (MEMI) and also partners with Live Nation.

Venues

Riverbend Music Center
When Riverbend opened in 1984, it was one of only 16 outdoor music amphitheaters in the United States and it helped revive the Cincinnati concert scene. Many concert promoters avoided Cincinnati following the December 3, 1979, The Who rock concert tragedy, in which 11 people died at Riverfront Coliseum. The city passed tough crowd control ordinances, which kept major acts away. Despite those factors, promoters gave the venue a chance and the fans were excited to see acts who had been avoiding the city since 1979.

The land was once the home of 2 popular rollercoasters, The Wildcat and Shooting Star, the latter was demolished in 1971. Due to its location next to the Ohio River, parts of the venue can become flooded, canceling shows. A Pearl Jam concert in 2003 and a 2001 show by Oasis and The Black Crowes were among the shows canceled.

The venue's first performance was by Erich Kunzel & The Cincinnati Pops Orchestra, with special guests Ella Fitzgerald and Neil Armstrong, on July 4, 1984. The British group the Spice Girls played a show, during the North American leg of their Spiceworld Tour, on July 18, 1998. On July 4, 2000, The Pops performed the first live concert televised from Cincinnati, which aired on PBS, featuring Rosemary Clooney and Doc Severinsen. The Dave Matthews Band performed and recorded their show, on June 26, 2000, which was later released as a live album, entitled Live Trax Vol. 16. Sting performed during his Symphonicities Tour on July 20, 2010, along with the Royal Philharmonic Orchestra. 

The amphitheatre has also played host to music festivals, including Crüe Fest, Crüe Fest 2, Curiosa, Lilith Fair, Lollapalooza, the Mayhem Festival, Ozzfest, Projekt Revolution, The Horde Festival and the Vans Warped Tour.Also, in 1995, The Alan Parsons Project played live.

Jimmy Buffett at Riverbend
Jimmy Buffett has played at Riverbend every year since 1988. As of his 2008 appearance, he has performed for 41 consecutive sell-out crowds.  There are only two other venues at which he has played more shows (Comcast Center and Merriweather Post Pavilion).  His following in Cincinnati started at Kings Island's Timberwolf Amphitheater, where the phrase Parrotheads was coined. Every year since, his concerts sell out in minutes, and is one of the toughest tickets to get in Cincinnati. Because of the sellouts, he played two shows in 1989. As shows continued to sell out, Buffett was one of a few artists who played multiple nights at Riverbend. He played two shows in 1989 and 1990, three in 1991, four in 1992, and a five-night stint in 1993. He continued to play multiple nights through 2000. During the summer of 2001, fans in Cincinnati were disappointed when only one show was played that year. Even though the shows continued to sell out in record breaking time, he has just played one show each year since 2001.

During his two-night stay at Riverbend in 1990, he recorded live songs for the album Feeding Frenzy.

PNC Pavilion

Riverbend has built an additional 4,100 seat pavilion, The PNC Pavilion, adjacent to the current box office. The pavilion opened on May 24, 2008 with Cincinnati's Over the Rhine. The band performed their entire Ohio album on the venue's opening night. In January 2009 National City Pavilion became PNC Pavilion due to PNC's purchase of National City bank.

See also
 List of contemporary amphitheatres

External links
 Riverbend Music Center – Official Site
 Riverbend Music Center – Concert Listings

References

1984 establishments in Ohio
Amphitheaters in Ohio
Michael Graves buildings
Music venues completed in 1984
Music venues in Cincinnati
Music venues in Ohio
Tourist attractions in Cincinnati